Albert Gemmrich (born February 13, 1955) is a retired football striker from France, who obtained 5 caps (two goals) for the France national team.

Career statistics

International goals

Titles
French championship in 1979 with RC Strasbourg

References

External links
  French Football Federation Profile
 Stats

1955 births
Living people
People from Haguenau
French people of German descent
French footballers
France international footballers
Association football forwards
RC Strasbourg Alsace players
FC Girondins de Bordeaux players
Lille OSC players
OGC Nice players
Ligue 1 players
Ligue 2 players
Footballers from Alsace
Sportspeople from Bas-Rhin